Honey bee is any bee of the genus Apis.

Honey bee or Honeybee may also refer to:

Places
Honeybee, Kentucky, a community in the United States

Music 
HoneyBee (band), lead singer Yuria
"Honey Bee", a 1951 song by Muddy Waters
"Honeybee", a song by New Birth from their 1971 album Ain't No Big Thing, But It's Growing
"Honey Bee", a 1974 song by Gloria Gaynor
"Honey Bee", a song by Stevie Ray Vaughan & Double Trouble from the 1984 album Couldn't Stand the Weather
"Honey Bee", a song by Tom Petty from his 1994 album Wildflowers
"Honeybee", a song by Garbage from their 2005 singles "Sex Is Not the Enemy" and "Run Baby Run" 
"Honey Bee", a song by Madrugada from the 2008 album Madrugada
"Honey Bee" (Blake Shelton song), 2011
"Honeybee", a song by Steam Powered Giraffe from their 2012 album The 2¢ Show
"Honeybee", a song by the Head and the Heart from their 2019 album Living Mirage

Films
Honey Bee (film), a 2013 Malayalam film by Jean Paul Lal
The Honey Bee, a 1920 American film with Marguerite Sylva

Other uses
Honeybee Robotics, a small spacecraft technology and robotics company
Beecraft Honey Bee, an American homebuilt aircraft from 1952
Howland H-2 Honey Bee, an American homebuilt aircraft from 1986
Datsun Honey Bee, a North American version of the Nissan Sunny car

See also
Honey to the B, an album by Billie Piper
"Honey to the Bee", a 1999 song by Billie Piper
Bee (disambiguation)